Chertsey Town Football Club is a semi-professional football club based in Chertsey, Surrey, England. The club currently competes in the Isthmian League South Central Division.

The home of Football 

The club was established as Chertsey Football Club in 1890 and joined the Metropolitan League in 1963. After three seasons, they moved to the Spartan League and finished as runners-up in the 1974–75 season. The following year, they became founder members of the London Spartan League after a merger of their existing league merged with the Metropolitan-London League. Chertsey Town joined the Athenian League a year later and remained until the league disbanded in 1984. They subsequently joined the Isthmian League but immediately suffered relegation to the Combined Counties League. The club returned at the first time of asking as runners-up, and in 1986 began a 20 season stay in the Isthmian League, achieving three promotions and three relegations across the divisions.

In 2006, the Curfews returned to the Combined Counties League with a restructuring of the non-league pyramid and regularly finished in the top half of the table. In 2011, Chertsey Town finished as runners up and were promoted to the Southern League Division One Central after a dispute over the suitability of the league winner's ground for the higher division. However, the club struggled for three seasons before suffering relegation back to the Combined Counties League. In the 2018–19 season, the Curfews won the Combined Counties League Premier Division with just three defeats and were crowned FA Vase winners at Wembley Stadium. The club returned to the Isthmian League in 2019 but saw the first two seasons curtailed.

History

1890–1963: Formation and early origins 
Evidence of organised football in Chertsey goes back to the 19th century, although county affiliation did not immediately occur. Chertsey Football Club was officially founded in 1890 and played its early matches in the West Surrey League. The club's first success came in the Surrey Junior Cup in 1897, and after a one-year postponement, the competition became the East and West Surrey League. A second halt in action followed during World War I, and Chertsey Town subsequently joined the Surrey Intermediate League in 1919. The club rejected an invitation to become founder members of the Surrey Senior League in 1923, and they remained in the league for two decades before World War II forced another break.

In 1946, the Curfews attained senior status and finally joined the Surrey Senior League. The club later became known as Chertsey Town Football Club in 1951. After a few seasons of adapting to their new level, the club enjoyed a halcyon period and lifted their first league title during the 1569–60 season. They repeated their league success twice in the following three years, while also lifting the League Cup three times.

1963–1986: Turning professional and returning to local football
Due to the static nature of amateur football, the club could not progress to the preferred Corinthian League, and opted to turn professional to join the Metropolitan League in 1963. The league consisted of several 'A' teams of professional clubs, including Arsenal, Tottenham Hotspur and West Ham United. However, after three seasons, the club decided the cost was too much to bear and temporarily joined the lower levels of the Greater London League for a single season. In 1967, the club joined the Spartan League and spent several seasons in the bottom half of the table.

The Curfews enjoyed brief success as league and cup runners-up in the 1974–75 season, and became founder members of the London Spartan League the following year due to a merger with the Metropolitan-London League. However, they finished bottom of the league in the first season and consequently joined the Athenian League Division Two. After another bottom placed finish, the Athenian League Divisions One and Two merged and Chertsey Town faced an uninspiring seven-year spell, enduring two further bottom placed finishes and only a single top 10 finish. In 1984, the club joined the Isthmian League Division Two South but continued to struggle on the pitch. Just two wins from 36 matches and a three point deduction saw the club finish bottom of the league and relegated to the Combined Counties League. Nonetheless, success quickly returned to Alwyns Lane as the Curfews finished second and lifted the League Cup before returning to the Isthmian League.

1986–2006: Becoming Isthmian League regulars 
Chertsey Town's return to the Isthmian League immediately proved more successful with consecutive sixth-placed finishes. The club endured several strong seasons in the coming years, but were forced to join the new Division Three after a divisional split in 1991. However, the Curfews ensured their spell was a brief one and scored 115 goals en route to a runner's up position and a promotion spot. Following a season of consolidation back in Division Two, the club enjoyed another high-scoring campaign and netted 121 times as they finished one point below the league champions, while also lifting the League Cup, League Charity Shield and Carlsberg Trophy. Chertsey's dominant performances continued with the step up to Division One, and the club once again finished as the league's highest scorers while securing a promotion in third place.

The Curfews enjoyed a respectable 15th place finish in their maiden campaign in the Premier Division, but struggled in the following 1996–97 season. A late rally of results proved insufficient in taking Chertsey off the bottom of the table and the club suffered their performance-based relegation in over a decade. After two seasons of mid-table obscurity, the 1999–2000 season produced another relegation back down to Division Two. Respectable positions were attained for the next two seasons before an Isthmian League re-structuring saw Chertsey Town allocated to the Division One South. However, the step up immediately proved too much for the club, and 139 goals conceded in 46 matches led to a return to Division Two. The Curfews found their footing in the division with top six finishes in all three seasons, but the dissolution of the division meant the club were allocated back to the Combined Counties League in 2006.

2006–2018: The gradual decline in the Combined Counties 
The club's four consecutive seasons in the Combined Counties Premier Division produced exciting times for the club. After an initial eighth place finish, the club improved every season and climbed to third before back-to-back runner's up spots. The 2010–11 season saw Chertsey finish three points behind league champions Guildford City, although resulted in their promotion with Guildford's ground unable to meet the demands of the higher tier's regulations. The Curfews were placed in the Southern League Division One Central and despite lowly finishes, ensured survival in their first two campaigns. However, the 2013–14 campaign proved too challenging for the club and the club suffered relegation to the Combined Counties after conceding 117 goals. Chertsey Town continued to struggle in the lower tier and finished 20th out of 21 teams in their first season back. The following campaign produced slight improvements, although the club finished in an underwhelming 18th position. It soon appeared that the Curfews had found their level in the Combined Counties League, with 19th and 15th place finishes as the league gradually expanded to 23 teams.

2018–present: The Dave Anderson impact and Wembley success 
In 2018, with the club struggling to progress from the ninth tier, former club chairman David Rayner returned to assist the club and help improve the playing squad. One of his first actions was the hiring of a new manager, helping to appoint former AFC Wimbledon boss Dave Anderson after a three-year hiatus. His arrival led to considerable changes and helped Chertsey Town find their form in the Combined Counties Premier Division. In Anderson's first full season in charge, the Curfews went on to win the league with six games to spare, finishing 13 points above their challengers and suffering just three defeats. In addition, forward Jake Baxter was named the league's top scorer with 35 goals in 29 games.

However, the season is most fondly remembered for their FA Vase journey, which saw them compete in all ten rounds before being crowned winners at Wembley Stadium. The Curfews beat Woodley United and Tadley Calleva in the qualifying rounds, before recording an empathic 6–1 win against Flackwell Health in the First Round. Chertsey Town then struck 16 goals without reply against Horndean, Redbridge, AFC St. Austell, Irlam and West Auckland Town to progress to the semi-finals. In the first round to be played over two legs, they recorded a 1–1 draw away to Northwich Victoria before enduring a 0–0 stalemate after extra time in front of 1,847 supporters. With a penalty shoot required to separate the two teams, all five Chertsey Town players converted their kicks to secure a 5–3 shootout victory and a place in the final. On 19 May 2019, Chertsey Town were crowned FA Vase winners after a 3–1 victory against Cray Valley Paper Mills. After going a goal down in the first half, Sam Flegg quickly responded before Jake Baxter and Quincy Rowe sealed the win in extra time in front of 42,962 spectators.

Following their league and cup success, Anderson immediately announced his retirement from football and club captain Kevin Maclaren was named his successor as player-manager. The club was promoted back to the Isthmian League and placed in the South Central Division, although saw their first two seasons curtailed due to the COVID-19 pandemic. In February 2021, Rayner stepped down from his role as Director of Football. During the 2021–22 season, the club continued their cup success by reaching the FA Cup Fourth Qualifying Round for the first time in their history. After beating higher division Chesham United and handing Jersey Bulls their first ever competitive home defeat, the Curfews lost finally to National League club Southend United.

Manager Ian Selley took over from Kevin Maclaren in November 2021, but resigned as Chertsey Town manager in May 2022 after the club were beaten 3-2 after extra-time in the 2022 Isthmian South Central play-off final by Hanwell Town. Wayne Carter, joint manager of Hanwell, was announced as his replacement. Following the departure of Carter in September 2022, Dave Anderson returned to the club having come out of retirement.

Ground

Chertsey Town play their home games at Alwyns Lane, Chertsey, Surrey, KT16 9DW.

The club played at various locations within the parish before settling down at their present home in 1929. The ground was donated by Sir Edward Stern to the 'premier club in the parish', with adjacent facilities also provided for Chertsey Cricket Club. The main stand at Alwyns Lane was constructed in the mid-1950s, with covered enclosures added behind the goals in 1994 and 2010. The original clubhouse was added in 1960 and rebuilt with additions in 1976. In 2020, the clubhouse was developed and redesigned in celebration of their FA Vase win.

Players

Current squad

Honours

 FA Vase:
 Winners (1): 2018–19
 Quarter-finalists (2): 1987–88, 1991–92

 Combined Counties League Premier Division:
 Winners (1): 2018–19
 Runners-up (3): 1985–86, 2009–10, 2010–11
 Combined Counties League Cup:
 Winners (1): 1985–86
 Isthmian League:
 Division Two Runners-up (1): 1993–94
 Division Three Runners-up (1): 1991–92
 Isthmian League Cup:
 Winners (1): 1993–94

 Southern Combination Challenge Cup:
 Winners (1): 1998–99
 Spartan League:
 Runners-up (1): 1974–75
 Spartan League Cup:
 Runners-up (1): 1974–75
 Surrey Senior Cup:
 Runners-up (1): 1985–86
 Surrey Senior League:
 Winners (3): 1958–59, 1960–61, 1961–62
 Surrey Senior League Challenge Cup:
 Winners (2): 1960–61, 1961–62
 Surrey Junior Cup:
 Winners (1): 1896–97
 Runners-up (1): 1910–11

 Surrey Junior League:
 Winners (1): 1919–1920

Records

 FA Cup best performance: Fourth qualifying round, 4-1 defeat away to Southend united 2021/22.

 SFA Trophy best performance: Third qualifying round, 1994–95, 1995–96, 2011–12
 FA Vase best performance: Winners, 2018–19
 Surrey Senior Cup best performance: Runners up, 1985–86
 Record attendance: 2,150 vs Aldershot Town, Isthmian League Division Two, 4 December 1993.

References

External links

 Official website
 

Football clubs in England
Football clubs in Surrey
1890 establishments in England
Association football clubs established in 1890
Surrey County Intermediate League (Western)
Surrey Senior League
Spartan League
Corinthian League (football)
Metropolitan League
Greater London League
Athenian League
Isthmian League
Combined Counties Football League
Southern Football League clubs